Christian Democrat People's Party may refer to:
Christian Democratic People's Party of Switzerland
Christian Democratic People's Party (Hungary)
Christian-Democratic People's Party (Moldova)
Christian-Democratic People's Party (Romania)